Cantata de Chile is a 1976 Cuban social realist musical epic film directed by Humberto Solás about the Santa María School massacre in Chile in 1907.

Cast
 Nelson Villagra
 Shenda Román
 Eric Heresmann
 Alfredo Tornquist
 Leonardo Perucci
 Peggy Cordero
 Flavia Ugalde
 Roberto Contreras

References

External links

1976 films
Cuban musical films
Films set in Chile